Dodge College of Film and Media Arts is one of 10 schools constituting Chapman University, located in Orange, California,  south of Los Angeles. The school offers undergraduate and graduate degrees, with programs in film production, screenwriting, creative producing, news, documentary, public relations, advertising, digital arts, film studies, television writing, producing, and screen acting.

Dodge College has approximately 1,465 students: 1,209 in the undergraduate program and 256 in the graduate program.

History
The School of Film and Television was created in 1996 with Robert Bassett as the founding dean. The school occupied a building on main campus named for filmmaker Cecil B. DeMille, in honor of support by CeCe Presley, DeMille's grand daughter. Bassett subsequently led a campaign that ultimately raised $52-million to build and equip a new building. A gift of $20-million from Lawrence and Kristina Dodge led to the naming of Lawrence and Kristina Dodge College of Film and Media Arts, housed in Marion Knott Studios, named for philanthropist Marion Knott, who made a major gift to the project.

Robert Bassett resigned as dean in 2019. Following his resignation, associate dean and professor Michael Kowalski served as the interim dean. In January 2020, Dodge College announced its hiring of Stephen Galloway, executive editor of The Hollywood Reporter, as the new dean, effective March 30, 2020.

Facilities
The school is housed within three buildings in Orange, California.

Marion Knott Studios, a  building designed to replicate a working production studio. Open 24/7 to students, it includes:
 2 sound stages, 
 Cinematography and directing insert stage
 Television and broadcast journalism hi-def stage and control room
 Foley stage
 Locker rooms, hair/makeup studio, green room
 2 audition rooms
 Set design shop
 Production design studio
 Production management office with computers, phones, fax, printers, and meeting space
 2 computer labs
 36 individual editing suites
 4 mixing studios
 Spirit 4K Datacine
 500-seat Folino theater with film and digital projection as well as Dolby Atmos surround sound

The Digital Media Arts Center, an  building for the Digital Arts - Animation and Visual Effects programs, opened for classes in the fall of 2014. The Digital Media Arts Center is a working, industry-standard studio that rivals those of Pixar, Disney, Microsoft, and Google. It combines “hang-out spaces” that include a coffee bar, relaxed indoor lounge and large patio with picnic tables, with flexible classrooms and laboratories that provide Dodge College students with access to the very latest technology so that they are well-prepared to work as professionals on Hollywood's most technically sophisticated projects. It includes:

 A 32-workstation dual monitor digital arts computer lab with 22”HD cintiq drawing surface and ergotron extension arm.
 A 25-workstation digital arts computer lab with 22”HD cintiq drawing surface and ergotron extension arm with 2d animation light-box drawing station.
 10 private digital arts suites complete with 42” plasma preview monitor, large-format scanners, and 2d animation down-shooters for traditional hand-drawn animation.
 Natural sky-lit art studio, with 25 wood-bench stations for still art drawing or painting.
 Screening room with tiered seating and a 4k stereoscopic projection system with a Fuse DCP projection system.
 directing stage, with 2k projection and ceiling grid lighting.
 A full 65 blade render farm powered by both Quanta and IBM xeon-based computers. The render farm is located offsite at Marion Knott next door, but is tied into each station in the Digital Media Arts Center.

Chapman Studios West is a 38,000-square-foot building that supports Dodge College's documentary filmmaking program in the Dhont Documentary Center. It includes: 
  screening room with seating for 50
  cinematography stage
  scene shop with equipment including a Computer Numerical Control Machine that cuts material through computer input
  props/set warehouse that includes 18,000 individual props inherited from Laguna Playhouse available for student productions
 2 Editing Suites
 1 Sound Mixing/Color Correction Finishing Suite

Programs

===Undergraduate===

Degrees

Bachelor of Arts

•  Film and Media Studies, B.A.

•  Public Relations, Advertising, and Entertainment Marketing, B.A.

Bachelor of Fine Arts

•  Animation and Visual Effects, B.F.A.

•  Broadcast Journalism and Documentary, B.F.A.

•  Creative Producing, B.F.A.

•  Film and Television Production, B.F.A.

•  Screen Acting, B.F.A.

•  Writing for Film and Television, B.F.A.

Minors

•  Advertising, Minor

•  Broadcast Journalism, Minor

•  Documentary Film, Minor

•  Film and Media Studies, Minor

•  Production Design for Film, Minor

•  Public Relations, Minor

•  Television, Minor

•  Visual Effects, Minor

•  VR and AR, Minor

Integrated Programs

•  Integrated Bachelor’s degree/Master of Arts in Film and Media Studies

Graduate conservatory
 M.A. Film Studies
 M.F.A. Film Production
 M.F.A. Film and Television Producing
 M.F.A. Production Design
 M.F.A. Screenwriting
 M.B.A./M.F.A. Film and TV Producing
 M.F.A. Documentary Filmmaking

Joint degrees 
 J.D./M.F.A. Film and TV Producing (with Chapman University School of Law)
 M.B.A./M.F.A Film and TV Producing (with Argyros School of Business and Economics)

Minors offered in Dodge College include film studies, broadcast journalism, television, advertising, public relations, visual effects, production design for film, and documentary film.

The Summer Film Academy offers two-week courses to students entering their junior or senior year in high school

Conferences and festivals
Women in Focus is an annual conference celebrating the women who have been successful in the often male dominated film business. The college invites women who work in film as panelists, to show clips of their work and discuss the challenges facing women in the industry. Past panels have included female directors, producers, production designers, editors, cinematographers, and studio executives and more:

The Sikh Film Festival is an annual three-day festival at the college showcasing a diverse assortment of Sikh-centric films, books, art performance pieces and music .

Select student films are screened for industry representatives at the Directors Guild of America (DGA) in Los Angeles each fall and in New York each spring.

The college has hosted the University Film and Video Association (UFVA) Conference three times, in 1996, 2006, and 2013.

The college hosted the Centre International de Liaison des Ecoles de Cinéma et de Télévision (CILECT) Conference in 2014.

Filmmaker-in-residence
Each semester, an industry veteran spends 15 weeks at Dodge College screening films and working individually with ten selected students.

Chapman Filmed Entertainment
In March 2011, the college created Chapman Filmed Entertainment, a film production and distribution company. Composed of industry veterans, advisors, and Chapman faculty, the company is intended to produce five to ten pictures per year with budgets ranging from   $250,000-$625,000

International connections

 A scholarship program enables students to travel to various countries to create documentaries about NGOs.
 Students participate in an exchange program with the Seoul Institute of the Arts and Dongseo University in Korea, the Graduate Institute of Filmmaking of Taipei National University of the Arts in Taiwan, and Ngee Ann Polytechnic in Singapore
 Chapman is one of 14 U.S. colleges and universities elected to membership in the Centre International de Liaison des Ecoles de Cinéma et de Télévision (CILECT), th 
 Chapman previously offered a B.F.A. degree in Creative Producing in Singapore, in partnership with the School of Film and Media Studies at Ngee Ann Polytechnic, however, that partnership has since ended.

Notable alumni

Jason Michael Brescia, writer/director (The Newest Pledge)
Chris Marrs Piliero, winner, VMA Music Award
 Olatunde Osunsanmi, director (The Fourth Kind)
Ben York Jones, writer (Like Crazy)
Matt Duffer and Ross Duffer, creators (Stranger Things)
Harshvardhan Kapoor, actor (Mirzya),(Bhavesh Joshi)
Sam Gharibian, director/producer (The Sinners),(360 Degree)
Justin Simien, creator (Dear White People)

References

External links 

 Chapman University: Dodge College Website 
 The Hollywood Reporter Profile

Chapman University
Film schools in California
Education in Orange, California
Educational institutions established in 1996
1996 establishments in California